Events in the year 2011 in China.

Incumbents 
 Party General Secretary - Hu Jintao
 President – Hu Jintao
 Premier – Wen Jiabao
 Vice President – Xi Jinping
 Vice Premier – Li Keqiang
 Congress Chairman - Wu Bangguo
 Conference Chairman - Jia Qinglin

Governors 
 Governor of Anhui Province – Wang Sanyun (until December), Li Bin (starting December)
 Governor of Fujian Province – Huang Xiaojing (until April), Su Shulin (starting April)
 Governor of Gansu Province – Liu Weiping 
 Governor of Guangdong Province – Zhu Xiaodan (until 5 November), Huang Huahua (starting 5 November)
 Governor of Guizhou Province – Zhao Kezhi (until December), Chen Min'er (starting December)
 Governor of Hainan Province – Luo Baoming (until August), Jiang Dingzhi (starting August)
 Governor of Hebei Province – Chen Quanguo (until 27 August)
 Governor of Heilongjiang Province – Wang Xiankui 
 Governor of Henan Province – Guo Gengmao 
 Governor of Hubei Province – Wang Guosheng 
 Governor of Hunan Province – Xu Shousheng 
 Governor of Jiangsu Province – Li Xueyong 
 Governor of Jiangxi Province – Wu Xinxiong (until June), Lu Xinshe (starting June)
 Governor of Jilin Province – Wang Rulin (until December), Bayanqolu (starting December)
 Governor of Liaoning Province – Chen Zhenggao 
 Governor of Qinghai Province – Luo Huining 
 Governor of Shaanxi Province – Zhao Zhengyong 
 Governor of Shandong Province – Jiang Daming
 Governor of Shanxi Province – Wang Jun (until December), Li Xiaopeng (starting December) 
 Governor of Sichuan Province – Jiang Jufeng 
 Governor of Yunnan Province – Qin Guangrong (until August), Li Jiheng (starting August)
 Governor of Zhejiang Province – Lü Zushan (until August), Xia Baolong (starting August)

Events

January
 January 6 – Jiaxing Xiuzhou District case of fish kill.
 January 11 – China successfully tests the Chengdu J-20 Black Eagle, one of its fifth generation stealth, twin-engine fighter aircraft programs.
 January 23 – CCTV Chengdu J-10 footage controversy

February
 February 1 – The Chinese government begins efforts to combat an ongoing drought.
 February 20 – 2011 Chinese pro-democracy protests
 February 28 – 2011 crackdown on dissidents in the People's Republic of China (est.)

March

 March 2 – 2011 Gyeongryeolbi island fishing incident
 March 10 – 2011 Yunnan earthquake: At least 24 people are killed and 207 injured following a 5.4 magnitude earthquake in Yingjiang County of the Yunnan province near the Burma border.
 March 16 – Phuntsog self-immolation incident
 March 29 – 2011 Yunnan protest

April
 April 5 – The Ministry of Health dismissed media coverages about Yinzibing (HIV-negative AIDS).
 April 13 – 2011 Shanghai riot
 April 14 – 2011 BRICS summit
 April 20 – 2011 Shanghai Truckers Strike
 April 22 – Wang Jia-zheng (汪家正) self-immolation incident
 April 28 – Xi'an China International Horticultural Exposition 2011

May
 May 10 – 2011 Xilinhot incident
 May 13 – Yang Xianwen (杨显文) Tianzhu bank bombing case
 May 20 – 2011 Chengdu Foxconn explosion incident
 May 26 – 2011 Fuzhou, Jiangxi bombings
 May  – My Heart Sings Loud television variety show is launched by Dragon TV.

June
 June 1 – Painting Dwelling in the Fuchun Mountains reunify the two halves of the painting held by Republic of China and the People's Republic of China
 June 6 – 2011 Chaozhou riot
 June 7 – Wang Meng assault incident
 June 10 –
 Tianjin bombing
 2011 Zengcheng riot
 June 11 – 2011 China floods (est.)
 June 11 – 17 – 3rd Straits Forum
 June 16 – Mutiny on Lurongyu 2682, a fishing trawler in the South Pacific. After a month-long killings from this day, 11 of the 33 crew returned to China.
 June 26 – National Red Games, celebration of 90th anniversary of founding of Communist party

July
 July 1 – Jiang Zemin disappearance and death rumor
 July 5 – Disclosure of China National Offshore Oil Corporation 2011 Bohai bay oil spill
 July 11 – 2011 Huizhou refinery explosion incident
 July 18 – 2011 Hotan attack
 July 23 – 2011 Wenzhou train collision
 July 24 – Canada extradites Lai Changxing to China
 July 30–31 – 2011 Kashgar attacks

August
 August 1 – Nepal rejects China-UN backed Lumbini project
 August 4 – 2011 Nanchang mass suicide protest
 August 11 – 2011 Qianxi riot
 August 14 – Dalian PX protest
 August 12 – 2011 Summer Universiade
 August 26 – 2011 Jiangmen dog ban
 August 30 - Yunnan Nanpan River chromium toxic spill (est.)

September
 September 1 – First China-Eurasia Expo
 September 16 – Line 2, The first line of the Xian Subway was completed.
 September 23 – 2011 Lufeng city riot
 September 26 – Lobsang Kalsang and Lobsang Konchok self-immolation incident
 September 27 – Shandong Foxconn fire incident
 September 29 – Launch of Tiangong 1

October
 October 5 – 13 Chinese crew members of two ships are murdered in the Mekong River massacre
 October 10 – 100th Anniversary of Xinhai Revolution
 October 13 – Death of Wang Yue and public outcry in the aftermath
 October 19 – Seventh Chen-Chiang summit
 October 21 – 2011 Tiananmen Square self-immolation incident
 October 26 – 2011 Zhili riot
 October 31 – Announcement of Sunway BlueLight, first supercomputer to use domestic processors

November
 November 1 – Launch of Shenzhou 8
 November 12 – 2011 Zhongshan riot
 November 14 – Xi'an gas explosion
 November 16 – 2011 Gansu school bus crash
 November 20 – North Korean guards cross to Kuandian Manchu Autonomous County after death of Kim Jong-il
 November 27 – Billionaire real estate tycoon Huang Nubo is rejected to purchase parts of Iceland

December
 December 12 – 2011 Incheon fishing incident
 December 21 - Protests of Wukan end
 December 28 - 2011 Pishan hostage crisis

Deaths
 January 14 – Liu Huaqing, 94, Chinese naval commander (1982–1988).
 February 13 – Shi Yafeng, 91, Chinese geologist.
 February 17 – Augustine Hu Daguo, 88, Chinese Roman Catholic underground bishop of Guiyang.
 February 19 – Yuan Xuefen, 88, Chinese Yue opera actress.
 August 7 – Li Xing (黎星), 54, Chinese-English journalist

Full date unknown
Liang Tianzhu, Chinese painter (born 1916)

See also
 List of political self-immolations

References

 
Years of the 21st century in China
China
2010s in China
China